Eieg/D-Town Music Group (DMG) is an American independent record label established in 2004 and distributed through Universal Music Group Distribution and based out of Dallas, TX. The CEO Nate Edwards, a native of Cincinnati, OH, met with Funk legend, Bootsy Collins, CEO Of Bootzilla Productions, in Cincinnati, OH, at the tribute concert to Bootsy's mentor, James Brown, on Saturday December 22, 2007, at which time a business relationship was formed. As of September, 2009, Eieg/D-Town Music Group had forged an exclusive U.S. and Worldwide distribution agreement with Bungalo Records and Universal Music Group Distribution.  Bungalo Records and Universal Music Group Distribution will also pursue synchronization and licensing deals for Eieg/D-Town Music Group releases.

It is not to be confused with Mike Hank's 1960s Detroit, Michigan soul music D-Town label.

Recognition

Their hit song from The Deele "Two Occasions" was later referenced (along with Babyface and Darnell "Dee" Bristol) by Mariah Carey in her 2005 mega hit song "We Belong Together," rapper, The Game on the song "One Night" in 2006, and Plies 2009 hit song, "Want It, Need It" featuring Ashanti. MF Doom samples the track "Shootem Up Movies" in his 1999 opus "Red & Gold."

Locations
Eieg/D-Town Music Group has locations in Dallas, TX, Cincinnati, OH, Atlanta, GA, and Tokyo, Japan.

About EIEG/D-Town
Industry : music and entertainment

Products : music, publishing and entertainment

Key people :
 Nathaniel G. Edwards: (chairman/CEO),
 Steven Franklin (president),
 Darryl Ethley (CFO)
 Anthony Paul (president of A&R)

Distributing label :  Bungalo and Universal Music Group Distribution

Subsidiaries
DMG companies : 
 D-Town Music Group Inc. aka (DMG)
 EIEG Publishing
 EIEG, LLC (Edwards Independent Entertainment Group)
 DBA D-Town Records
 Nate"E" Entertainment Group

Business alliances

D-town Record is allied with Cintrton Beverage company, Violator (company), Curtis James Jackson III and Marian Records.

Discography

Artists on Eieg/D-Town Music Group

Present artist
 3riple Threat (Dallas, Texas)
 Seven Second Chase from Ontario, Canada
 The Gang of Roses from Atlanta, Georgia
 Gerald Brown (formerly of Shalamar)
 The Deele
 Keingz Ransom

References

 List of record labels
 Block Ent., Bad Boy South
 Chris Lighty Background

External links
 Official website
 Official Myspace
 Bootzilla Productions

Hip hop record labels